Ecclesiastical Latin, also called Church Latin or Liturgical Latin, is a form of Latin developed to discuss Christian thought in Late Antiquity and used in Christian liturgy, theology, and church administration down to the present day, especially in the Catholic Church. It includes words from Vulgar Latin and Classical Latin (as well as Greek and Hebrew) re-purposed with Christian meaning. It is less stylized and rigid in form than Classical Latin, sharing vocabulary, forms, and syntax, while at the same time incorporating informal elements which had always been with the language but which were excluded by the literary authors of Classical Latin.

Its pronunciation was partly standardized in the late 8th century during the Carolingian Renaissance as part of Charlemagne's educational reforms, and this new letter-by-letter pronunciation, used in France and England, was adopted in Iberia and Italy a couple of centuries afterwards. As time passed, pronunciation diverged depending on the local vernacular language, giving rise to even highly divergent forms such as the traditional English pronunciation of Latin, which has now been largely abandoned for reading Latin texts. Within the Catholic Church and in certain Protestant churches, such as the Anglican Church, a pronunciation based on modern Italian phonology, known as Italianate Latin, became common by the 20th century.

Ecclesiastical Latin was the language of liturgical rites in the Latin Church, as well as the Anglican Church, Lutheran Church, Methodist Church, and in the Western Rite of the Eastern Orthodox Church. Today, ecclesiastical Latin is primarily used in official documents of the Catholic Church, in the Tridentine Mass, and it is still learned by clergy.

The Ecclesiastical Latin that is used in theological works, liturgical rites and dogmatic proclamations varies in style: syntactically simple in the Vulgate Bible, hieratic (very restrained) in the Roman Canon of the Mass, terse and technical in Thomas Aquinas's , and Ciceronian (syntactically complex) in Pope John Paul II's encyclical letter .

Usage

Late antique usage
The use of Latin in the Church started in the late fourth century with the split of the Roman Empire after Emperor Theodosius in 395. Before this split, Greek was the primary language of the Church as well as the language of the eastern half of the Roman Empire. Following the split, early theologians like Jerome translated Greek and Hebrew texts into Latin, the dominant language of the Western Roman Empire. The loss of Greek in the Western half of the Roman Empire, and the loss of Latin in the Eastern half of the Roman Empire were not immediate, but changed the culture of language as well as the development of the Church. What especially differentiates Ecclesiastical Latin from Classical Latin is the consequences of its use as a language for translating, since it has borrowed and assimilated constructions and vocabulary from the koine Greek, while adapting the meanings of some Latin words to those of the koine Greek originals, which are sometimes themselves translations of Hebrew originals.

Medieval usage
At first there was no distinction between Latin and the actual Romance vernacular, the former being just the traditional written form of the latter. For instance, in ninth-century Spain  was simply the correct way to spell , meaning 'century'.

The spoken version of Ecclesiastical Latin was created later during the Carolingian Renaissance. The English scholar Alcuin, tasked by Charlemagne with improving the standards of Latin writing in France, prescribed a pronunciation based on a fairly literal interpretation of Latin spelling. The Carolingian reforms soon brought the new Church Latin from France to other lands where Romance was spoken.

Usage during the Reformation and in modern Protestant churches
The use of Latin in the Western Church continued into the Early modern period. One of Martin Luther's tenets during the Reformation was to have services and religious texts in the common tongue, rather than Latin, a language that at the time, many did not understand. Protestants refrained from using Latin in services, however Protestant clergy had to learn and understand Latin as it was the language of higher learning and theological thought until the 18th century. After the Reformation, in the Lutheran churches, Latin was retained as the language of the Mass for weekdays, although for the Sunday Sabbath, the Deutsche Messe was to be said. In Geneva, among the Reformed churches, "persons called before the consistory to prove their faith answered by reciting the Paternoster, the Ave Maria, and the Credo in Latin." In the Anglican Church, the Book of Common Prayer was published in Latin, alongside English. John Wesley, the founder of the Methodist churches, "used Latin text in doctrinal writings", as Martin Luther and John Calvin did in their era. In the training of Protestant clergy in Württemberg, as well as in the Rhineland, universities instructed divinity students in Latin and their examinations were conducted in this language. The University of Montauban, under Reformed auspices, required that seminarians complete two theses, with one being in Latin; thus Reformed ministers were "Latinist by training", comparable to Catholic seminarians.

Modern Catholic usage
Ecclesiastical Latin continues to be the official language of the Catholic Church. The Second Vatican Council (1962–1965) decreed that the Mass would be translated into vernacular languages. The Church produces liturgical texts in Latin, which provide a single clear point of reference for translations into all other languages. The same holds for the texts of canon law. Pope Benedict XVI gave his unexpected resignation speech in Latin.

The Holy See has for some centuries usually drafted documents in a modern language, but the authoritative text, published in the Acta Apostolicae Sedis, is usually in Latin. Some texts may be published initially in a modern language and be later revised, according to a Latin version (or “editio typica”), after this Latin version is published. For example, the Catechism of the Catholic Church was drafted and published, in 1992, in French. The Latin text appeared five years later, in 1997, and the French text was corrected to match the Latin version, which is regarded as the official text. The Latin-language department of the Vatican Secretariat of State (formerly the Secretaria brevium ad principes et epistolarum latinarum) is charged with the preparation in Latin of papal and curial documents. Sometimes, the official text is published in a modern language, e.g., the well-known edict Tra le sollecitudini (1903) by Pope Pius X (in Italian) and Mit brennender Sorge (1937) by Pope Pius XI (in German).

Comparison with Classical Latin

There are not many differences between Classical Latin and Church Latin. One can understand Church Latin knowing the Latin of classical texts, as the main differences between the two are in pronunciation and spelling, as well as vocabulary.

Like in Classical Latin, double consonants are pronounced with gemination.

The distinction in Classical Latin between long and short vowels is ignored, and instead of the 'macron' or 'apex', lines to mark the long vowel, an acute accent is used for stress. The first syllable of two-syllable words is stressed; in longer words, an acute accent is placed over the stressed vowel: adorémus 'let us adore'; Dómini 'of the Lord'.

Language materials
The complete text of the Bible in Latin, the revised Vulgate, appears at Nova Vulgata - Bibliorum Sacrorum Editio. New Advent gives the entire Bible, in the Douay version, verse by verse, accompanied by the Vulgate Latin of each verse.

In 1976, the Latinitas Foundation (Opus Fundatum Latinitas in Latin) was established by Pope Paul VI to promote the study and use of Latin. Its headquarters are in Vatican City. The foundation publishes an eponymous quarterly in Latin. The foundation also published a 15,000-word Italian-Latin Lexicon Recentis Latinitatis (Dictionary of Recent Latin), which provides Latin coinages for modern concepts, such as a bicycle (birota), a cigarette (fistula nicotiana), a computer (instrumentum computatorium), a cowboy (armentarius), a motel (deversorium autocineticum), shampoo (capitilavium), a strike (operistitium), a terrorist (tromocrates), a trademark (ergasterii nota), an unemployed person (invite otiosus), a waltz (chorea Vindobonensis), and even a miniskirt (tunicula minima) and hot pants (brevissimae bracae femineae). Some 600 such terms extracted from the book appear on a page of the Vatican website. The Latinitas Foundation was superseded by the Pontifical Academy for Latin in 2012.

Current use

Latin remains an oft-used language of the Holy See and the Latin liturgical rites of the Catholic Church. Until the 1960s and still later in Roman colleges like the Gregorian, Catholic priests studied theology using Latin textbooks and the language of instruction in many seminaries was also Latin, which was seen as the language of the Church Fathers. The use of Latin in pedagogy and in theological research, however, has since declined. Nevertheless, canon law requires for seminary formation to provide for a thorough training in Latin, though "the use of Latin in seminaries and pontifical universities has now dwindled to the point of extinction." Latin was still spoken in recent international gatherings of Catholic leaders, such as the Second Vatican Council, and it is still used at conclaves to elect a new Pope. The Tenth Ordinary General Assembly of the Synod of Bishops in 2004 was the most recent to have a Latin-language group for discussions.

Although Latin is the traditional liturgical language of the Western (Latin) Church, the liturgical use of the vernacular has predominated since the liturgical reforms that followed the Second Vatican Council: liturgical law for the Latin Church states that Mass may be celebrated either in Latin or another language in which the liturgical texts, translated from Latin, have been legitimately approved. The permission granted for continued use of the Tridentine Mass in its 1962 form authorizes use of the vernacular language in proclaiming the Scripture readings after they are first read in Latin.

In historic Protestant churches, such as the Anglican Communion and Lutheran churches, Ecclesiastical Latin is occasionally employed in sung celebrations of the Mass.

Church Latin kana
In the hymnbook used in the Catholic Church in Japan, there are some special kana characters.

References

Citations

Sources 

 
  (A course in ecclesiastical Latin.)

Further reading
A Primer of Ecclesiastical Latin by John F. Collins, (Catholic University of America Press, 1985) . A learner's first textbook, comparable in style, layout, and coverage to Wheelock's Latin, but featuring text selections from the liturgy and the Vulgate: unlike Wheelock, it also contains translation and composition exercises.

External links

Latin and the Catholic Church
  (in Latin here)
 
 Catechism of the Catholic Church in Latin
 Fr. Nikolaus Gihr, The Holy Sacrifice of the Mass "The Language Used in the Celebration of the Holy Mass"

Bibles
The Latin Vulgate version of the Bible
NewAdvent.org Side-by-side comparisons of the Ancient Greek, English, and Latin Vulgate Bibles.
Ordo Missae of the 1970 Roman Missal, Latin and English texts, rubrics in English only
Latin-English Study Bible Side-by-side of the Vulgate Latin and English
Parallel Latin-English Psalter

Breviaries
Divinum Officium
Latin-English pre-Vatican-II Breviary

Other documents
 
"Documenta Catholica Omnia"—Multi-language Catholic eBook database of all the writings of Holy Popes, Councils, Church Fathers and Doctors, and Allied Auctors. Retrieved November 2018.
 
The Christian Latin Library—a collection of ecclesiastical Latin texts by Christian authors. Retrieved November 2018.
Complete Latin works of St. Augustine
Latin Logos Library—contains Classical, Medieval, and Ecclesiastical texts.
The Logic Museum—a collection of ecclesiastical Latin. Retrieved November 18.
Pope Benedict XVI's First Message with interlinear Latin-English translations

Course
"First Experience Latin with Fr. Reginald Foster", an ecclesiastical Latin course. Retrieved November 2018.
The Vatican's Lexicon Retrieved November 2018.
Latin Dictionary and Grammar Aid . Retrieved November 2018.

Languages attested from the 4th century
Latin language
Forms of Latin
Christian liturgical languages
Latin liturgical rites
Latin Church
Western Christianity
Languages of Vatican City